Woodbine is a borough in Cape May County, in the U.S. state of New Jersey. It is part of the Ocean City metropolitan statistical area. As of the 2020 United States census, the borough's population was 2,128, a decrease of 344 (−13.9%) from the 2010 census count of 2,472, which in turn reflected a decline of 244 (−9.0%) from the 2,716 counted in the 2000 Census.

Woodbine was incorporated as a borough by an act of the New Jersey Legislature on March 3, 1903, from portions of Dennis Township.

History
Woodbine was founded in 1891 as a settlement for Eastern European Jews. The Baron DeHirsch Fund, organized by philanthropist Maurice de Hirsch, purchased  of land in Dennis Township in Cape May County to start a settlement. Immigrants from Poland and Russia were invited to settle the new community. The residential center of Woodbine still uses the same grid that was originally laid out in 1891. Using modern agricultural practices under the direction of agriculturist and chemist Hirsch Loeb Sabsovich, the first colonists (Woodbine was sometimes called the "Jewish Colony" in the early days) turned Woodbine into a model agricultural community.

Woodbine was incorporated as a borough by an act of the New Jersey Legislature on March 3, 1903, from portions of Dennis Township. Because most of the original settlers were Jewish, Woodbine became known as "the first self-governing Jewish community since the fall of Jerusalem."

The community started the Baron DeHirsch Agricultural College in 1894. Until it was closed during World War I (1917), the college was a model of progressive education. The college and its graduates won many state, national, and international awards. World War I, however, signaled a change in the community from an agricultural economy to one with a light manufacturing economy. The Baron DeHirsch Agricultural College became what is today the Woodbine Developmental Center, a state-run facility for training the mentally handicapped. The Developmental Center is Cape May County's largest employer.

During World War II, the United States Army built an airfield in Woodbine to be used as a training base and as a base for anti-submarine patrols. German U-boats were very active off the East Coast of America, especially off the Jersey coast. Today, Woodbine Municipal Airport is the center of Woodbine's redevelopment efforts.

Geography
According to the United States Census Bureau, the borough had a total area of 8.02 square miles (20.77 km2), all of which was land.

The borough borders Dennis Township and Upper Township.

Climate
The climate in this area is characterized by hot, humid summers and generally mild to cool winters.  According to the Köppen Climate Classification system, Woodbine has a humid subtropical climate, abbreviated "Cfa" on climate maps.

Demographics

2010 census

The Census Bureau's 2006–2010 American Community Survey showed that (in 2010 inflation-adjusted dollars) median household income was $28,125 (with a margin of error of +/− $7,957) and the median family income was $25,254 (+/− $5,816). Males had a median income of $35,500 (+/− $7,453) versus $31,298 (+/− $9,891) for females. The per capita income for the borough was $15,734 (+/− $2,126). About 33.9% of families and 38.1% of the population were below the poverty line, including 35.8% of those under age 18 and 15.8% of those age 65 or over.

2000 census
As of the 2000 United States census there were 2,716 people, 773 households, and 558 families residing in the borough. The racial makeup of the borough was 53.39% White, 32.40% African American, 0.22% Native American, 0.11% Asian, 11.01% from other races, and 2.87% from two or more races. Hispanic or Latino of any race were 21.24% of the population.

There were 773 households, out of which 41.5% had children under the age of 18 living with them, 39.1% were married couples living together, 27.8% had a female householder with no husband present, and 27.8% were non-families. 23.0% of all households were made up of individuals, and 9.6% had someone living alone who was 65 years of age or older. The average household size was 2.77 and the average family size was 3.21.

In the borough the population was spread out, with 26.6% under the age of 18, 8.0% from 18 to 24, 31.3% from 25 to 44, 23.7% from 45 to 64, and 10.4% who were 65 years of age or older. The median age was 36 years. For every 100 females, there were 142.5 males. For every 100 females age 18 and over, there were 158.2 males.

The median income for a household in the borough was $30,298, and the median income for a family was $31,786. Males had a median income of $30,139 versus $24,150 for females. The per capita income for the borough was $13,335. About 18.8% of families and 17.9% of the population were below the poverty line, including 23.9% of those under age 18 and 11.6% of those age 65 or over.

Government

Local government
Woodbine is governed under the Borough form of New Jersey municipal government, which is used in 218 municipalities (of the 564) statewide, making it the most common form of government in New Jersey. The governing body is comprised of the Mayor and the Borough Council, with all positions elected at-large on a partisan basis as part of the November general election. A Mayor is elected directly by the voters to a four-year term of office. The Borough Council is comprised of six members elected to serve three-year terms on a staggered basis, with two seats coming up for election each year in a three-year cycle. The Borough form of government used by Woodbine is a "weak mayor / strong council" government in which council members act as the legislative body with the mayor presiding at meetings and voting only in the event of a tie. The mayor can veto ordinances subject to an override by a two-thirds majority vote of the council. The mayor makes committee and liaison assignments for council members, and most appointments are made by the mayor with the advice and consent of the council.

, the Mayor of Woodbine is Republican William Pikolycky, whose term of office ends on December 31, 2022. The members of the Woodbine Borough Council are Council President Eduardo Ortiz (R, 2022), David Bennet (R, 2023), Michael E. Benson (R, 2024), Hector L. Cruz (R, 2023), Joseph E. Johnson III (R, 2024) and Mary Helen Perez (R, 2022).

In 2018, the borough had an average property tax bill of $1,947, the lowest in the county, compared to an average bill of $4,301 in Cumberland County and $8,767 statewide.

Federal, state and county representation
Woodbine is located in the 2nd Congressional District and is part of New Jersey's 1st state legislative district.

Politics
As of March 2011, there were a total of 1,470 registered voters in Woodbine, of which 286 (19.5%) were registered as Democrats, 537 (36.5%) were registered as Republicans and 647 (44.0%) were registered as Unaffiliated. There were no voters registered to other parties.

In the 2012 presidential election, Democrat Barack Obama received 71.6% of the vote (641 cast), ahead of Republican Mitt Romney with 27.4% (245 votes), and other candidates with 1.0% (9 votes), among the 917 ballots cast by the borough's 1,410 registered voters (22 ballots were spoiled), for a turnout of 65.0%. In the 2008 presidential election, Democrat Barack Obama received 66.4% of the vote (708 cast), ahead of Republican John McCain, who received 29.8% (318 votes), with 1,066 ballots cast among the borough's 1,386 registered voters, for a turnout of 76.9%. In the 2004 presidential election, Democrat John Kerry received 59.0% of the vote (526 ballots cast), outpolling Republican George W. Bush, who received around 38.6% (344 votes), with 891 ballots cast among the borough's 1,344 registered voters, for a turnout percentage of 66.3.

In the 2013 gubernatorial election, Republican Chris Christie received 49.3% of the vote (302 cast), ahead of Democrat Barbara Buono with 46.3% (284 votes), and other candidates with 4.4% (27 votes), among the 793 ballots cast by the borough's 1,387 registered voters (180 ballots were spoiled), for a turnout of 57.2%. In the 2009 gubernatorial election, Democrat Jon Corzine received 56.5% of the vote (476 ballots cast), ahead of both Republican Chris Christie with 29.2% (246 votes) and Independent Chris Daggett with 3.3% (28 votes), with 842 ballots cast among the borough's 1,540 registered voters, yielding a 54.7% turnout.

Education

The Woodbine School District serves students in public school for pre-kindergarten through eighth grade at Woodbine Elementary School. As of the 2018–19 school year, the district, comprised of one school, had an enrollment of 239 students and 23.6 classroom teachers (on an FTE basis), for a student–teacher ratio of 10.1:1.

Public school students in ninth through twelfth grades attend Middle Township High School as part of a sending/receiving relationship that began with the 2013–14 school year; students from Avalon, Dennis Township and Stone Harbor also attend the school. As of the 2018–19 school year, the high school had an enrollment of 767 students and 64.6 classroom teachers (on an FTE basis), for a student–teacher ratio of 11.9:1.

Students from Woodbine had previously been sent to attend high school in Millville, as part of a relationship with the Millville Public Schools. Students attended
Memorial High School for ninth grade and half of tenth and 
Millville Senior High School for 10th grade through the 12th grade with those in attendance as of the 2013–14 school year completing until their graduation.

Students are also eligible to attend Cape May County Technical High School in Cape May Court House, which serves students from the entire county in its comprehensive and vocational programs, which are offered without charge to students who are county residents. Special needs students may be referred to Cape May County Special Services School District in the Cape May Court House area.

The Roman Catholic Diocese of Camden operates Bishop McHugh Regional School, a Catholic K–8 school, in the Ocean View area, in Dennis Township, which has a Cape May Courthouse postal address. It is the parish school of Marmora/Woodbine Catholic Church and three other churches.

The Cape May County Public Library operates the Woodbine Branch.

Infrastructure
The Cape May County Municipal Utilities Authority's Sanitary Landfill is in Woodbine.

Transportation

Roads and highways

No Interstate, U.S. or state highways traverse Woodbine. The most significant roads serving the borough are County Route 550 and County Route 557.

Public transportation
NJ Transit offers the 313 inter-city bus route that runs between Cape May and Philadelphia.

Notable people

People who were born in, residents of, or otherwise closely associated with Woodbine include:

 Samuel Gallu (1918–1991), writer and producer and director of film and television
 Bubba Green (born 1957), former defensive lineman who played in the NFL for one season for the Baltimore Colts
 Jacob Goodale Lipman (1874–1939), professor of agricultural chemistry and researcher in the fields of soil chemistry and bacteriology
 Calvin Murray (born 1958), running back who played in the NFL for the Philadelphia Eagles
 Gregory Goodwin Pincus (1903–1967), biologist and researcher who co-invented the combined oral contraceptive pill
 Joseph Rabinowitz, founder of the Woodbine Children's Clothing Company, the community's largest employer, who was elected at age 37 in 1910 as third mayor of Woodbine; his descendants include grandson, Jay Rabinowitz, former Chief Justice of the Supreme Court of Alaska; Robert Rabinowitz, creator of Beatlemania, clinical psychologist Barrie R. Cassileth and Olympic athlete Judy Rabinowitz
 Herman Rosenthal (1843–1917), author, editor and librarian
 Hirsch Loeb Sabsovich (1860–1921), agronomist, chemist and agricultural educator who served as the first mayor of Woodbine

References

External links

 Woodbine Borough website
 Woodbine School District
 
 School Data for the Woodbine School District, National Center for Education Statistics
 The Cape May County Gazette Local community newspaper
 The Beachcomber

 
1903 establishments in New Jersey
Borough form of New Jersey government
Boroughs in Cape May County, New Jersey
Populated places established in 1903